The Armory, historically known as the First Regiment Armory Annex, and home to Portland Center Stage at The Armory, is a historic building with two theaters and is located in Portland, Oregon, United States. It was built in 1891 by Multnomah County to house the Oregon National Guard. In 2000, it was added to the National Register of Historic Places. Following a $36.1 million renovation project that lasted from 2002 to 2006, the building home to the theater company Portland Center Stage which produces 11 productions each season. An estimated 150,000 visitors visit The Armory annually to enjoy a mix of classical, contemporary and world premiere productions, along with the annual JAW: A Playwrights Festival, and a variety of high-quality education and community programs.

Construction
In the late 19th century, anti-Chinese sentiment, particularly along the West Coast of the United States, had led to anti-Chinese violence in Oregon and Washington. After violence turned to riot in some cases (such as in Seattle), the State of Oregon authorized construction of armories so that National Guard troops could drill, in an effort to prevent or control potential riots.

The First Regiment Armory in Portland was completed in 1888, but was immediately deemed too small, and so an Annex was commissioned to give troops stationed there more space for maneuvers. Amenities included an underground firing range. Constructed in 1891, the annex was built in the Romanesque Revival style that was popular from 1880 to 1890 and is identified by massive stone cladding and semi-circular arcades.  McCaw and Martin featured many Northwest quarry materials in the design. The annex is also an example of Castellated architecture.  The fortress-like structure has a recessed arched entrance flanked by turrets above. The turrets have crenelated parapets and loophole vertical gun slots.

Uses

Constructed with a truss system with no supporting pillars to block views or impede movement, the building was one of the few Portland buildings in the early 20th century that could handle large crowds. As a result, the building hosted exhibitions of early motion picture machines, conventions, reunions, recitals, concerts, and speeches by presidents Theodore Roosevelt, William Howard Taft, and Woodrow Wilson. In 1918, the new Municipal Auditorium (now called Keller Auditorium), designed with superior acoustics and comfortable seating, supplanted the Armory for concerts and speeches, though amateur boxing events were still held at the Armory.

In 1928, the Portland fire marshal declared the building to be a fire hazard; nonetheless, the building continued to be used. From 1946 to 1948, the Armory was home to the Portland Indians of the Pacific Coast Professional Basketball League. In 1948, the building was used to take in refugees of the Vanport Flood which destroyed the town of Vanport in 1948.

In 1968, the Blitz-Weinhard Brewing Company purchased the entire complex, demolishing the original Armory for a parking lot and using the Annex as a warehouse.

Present use
The Armory was the last piece of property in Portland's Pearl District Brewery Blocks to be redeveloped. The Portland development firm Gerding Edlen had redeveloped surrounding properties utilizing sustainable building practices and, when they bought the Armory complex in 2000, they pledged to maintain the historical character of the building while redeveloping the property.

The Armory now contains the 590-seat U.S. Bank Main Stage and 190-seat Ellyn Bye Studio. The reinvention of the building as an arts center was contemplated as early as 2002. The renovation cost $36.1 million.

The Armory has become a significant case study for historic preservation and sustainable design. It received a Platinum Leadership in Energy and Environmental Design (LEED) Certification, becoming the first building on the National Register and the first in Portland to achieve Platinum certification. As of 2007, it was one of only two Portland buildings to attain that status. Some of the green features include a catch system for rainwater, displacement ventilation systems, skylights for additional natural lighting and bicycle parking spaces.

See also
Powell's Books
Weinhard Brewery Complex
Portland Center Stage

References

External links
 

1891 establishments in Oregon
Armories in Oregon
Armories on the National Register of Historic Places
Basketball venues in Oregon
Event venues on the National Register of Historic Places in Oregon
Government buildings completed in 1891
Leadership in Energy and Environmental Design platinum certified buildings
Military facilities on the National Register of Historic Places in Oregon
National Register of Historic Places in Portland, Oregon
Pearl District, Portland, Oregon
Sports venues in Portland, Oregon